The following individuals held the rank of field marshal in Iran (Persia).

 Prince Husain Quli Khan-e Qajar Quyunlu (1742–1831)
 Prince Ja'afar Quli Khan-e Khajar Quyunlu (1751–1790)
 Amir Muhammad Qasim Khan-e Qajar Quyunlu (d. 1831)
 Crown Prince Abbas Mirza  (1789–1833)
 Prince Hasan Ali Mirza (1789–1853) 
 Prince Ali Shah Mirza (1796–1854)
 Fath-Ali Shah Qajar (1797–1834)
 Prince Kaikhusru Mirza (1809–1857)
 Prince Bahman Mirza Qajar (1811–1884)
 Prince Sultan Masud Mirza (1850–1918)
 1899 - Prince Vajihullah Mirza (1854–1905)
 Prince Kamran Mirza (1856–1927)
 Prince Abul Husain Mirza (1858–1939)
 1921 - Rezā Khan (later Rezā Shāh Pahlavī) (1878–1944)
 Mohammad Rezā Shāh Pahlavī (1919–1980)
 Amir Mirza Muhammad Khan-e Qajar Devehlu
 Mirza Muhammad Taqi Khan-e Farahani
 Agha Vali Khan
 Mirza Hosein Khan Qazvini
 Mirza Muhammad Bakir Khan

 
Field Marshals
Lists of field marshals

sl:Seznam iranskih feldmaršalov